Kaiserreich may refer to:

Empire, state ruled by an emperor
Holy Roman Empire (800/962–1806)
Austrian Empire (1804–1867)
Austro-Hungarian Empire (1867–1918)
German Empire (1871–1918)
Kaiserreich: Legacy of the Weltkrieg, a mod for Hearts of Iron IV

German words and phrases
Monarchy